Two ships of the United States Navy have been named Breton, after the Breton Sound of the Louisiana coast.

 , was a Bogue-class escort carrier, in service from 1943 to 1946.

References

United States Navy ship names